Xinhua Township may refer to:

 Xinhua Township, Anhui, in Huangshan District, Huangshan City
 Xinhua Township, Chongqing, in Qianjiang District
 Xinhua Township, Gansu, in Liangzhou District, Wuwei
 Xinhua Township, Guangxi, in Fuchuan Yao Autonomous County
 Xinhua Township, Guizhou, in Liuzhi Special District, Liupanshui
 Xinhua Township, Heilongjiang, in Beilin District, Suihua
 Xinhua Township, Ningnan County, Sichuan
 Xinhua Township, Tianquan County, Sichuan
 Xinhua Township, Pingbian County, in Pingbian Miao Autonomous County, Yunnan
 Xinhua Township, Tengchong County, Yunnan
 Xinhua Township, Yuanmou County, Yunnan
 Xinhua Yi and Miao Ethnic Township, Fengqing County, Yunnan